Torolf Rein (born 20 October 1934) is a Norwegian military officer, an admiral of the Royal Norwegian Navy. He served as Chief of Defence of Norway from 1989 to 1994.

References

1934 births
Living people
Royal Norwegian Navy admirals
Chiefs of Defence (Norway)